Neverovskoye is a rural locality (a village) in Podlesnoye Rural Settlement, Vologodsky District, Vologda Oblast, Russia. The population was 9 as of 2002. There are 2 streets.

Geography 
Neverovskoye is located 27 km southeast of Vologda (the district's administrative centre) by road. Nikultsevo is the nearest rural locality.

References 

Rural localities in Vologodsky District